St. Mary's Catholic Church is a parish church of the Diocese of Davenport. The church is located in Nichols, Iowa, United States. The parish was found in 1874 in the Diocese of Dubuque in what was then called Nichols Station. At the same time, a church building was constructed. A resident pastor was assigned to the parish in 1877. St. Mary's was incorporated into the Diocese of Davenport when it was founded in 1881. The original church building was destroyed in a fire. The present brick, Gothic Revival structure was completed in 1920. It was listed on the National Register of Historic Places in 2022.

References

External links

Parish website

Religious organizations established in 1874
1874 establishments in Iowa
Roman Catholic churches completed in 1920
20th-century Roman Catholic church buildings in the United States
Gothic Revival church buildings in Iowa
Churches in the Roman Catholic Diocese of Davenport
Churches on the National Register of Historic Places in Iowa
National Register of Historic Places in Muscatine County, Iowa